The Mendel Lectures is a series of lectures given by the world's top scientists in genetics, molecular biology, biochemistry, microbiology, medicine and related areas which has been held in the refectory of the Augustian Abbey of St. Thomas in Brno, Czech Republic since May 2003. The lectures were established to celebrate the 50th anniversary of the discovery of the structure of deoxyribonucleic acid (DNA) by James Watson (1928) and Francis Crick (1916-2004). The Mendel Lectures are named in honour of Gregor Johann Mendel (1822-1884), the founder of genetics, who lived and worked in the Augustinian Abbey in Brno 1843-1884. Based on his experiments conducted in the abbey between 1856 and 1863, Mendel established the basic rules of heredity, now referred to as the laws of Mendelian inheritance. The Mendel Lectures are organized by the Masaryk University, the Mendel Museum, and the St. Anne's University Hospital Brno. The eighteenth season of the Mendel Lectures is running at present. More than 100 top scientists, including many Nobel Prize winners, have visited Brno to give a Mendel Lecture, for example Tim Hunt, Jack W. Szostak, John Gurdon, Elizabeth Blackburn, Paul Nurse, Venkatraman Ramakrishnan, Günter Blobel, Kurt Wüthrich, Jules A. Hoffmann, Aaron Ciechanover, Ada Yonath, Paul Modrich, Eric F. Wieschaus, Fraser Stoddart and others.

History 
The first idea of the Mendel Lectures occurred during the international conference ´EMBO Workshop: Genetics after the Genome´ organised by Dieter Schweizer and Kim Nasmyth in 2002. Kim Nasmyth, at the time director of the Research Institute of Molecular Pathology, and his wife Anna Nasmyth, Imma Mautner Markhof from Austria, Jan Motlík of the Academy of Sciences of the Czech Republic and Jiřina Relichová of the Masaryk University prepared and organized the very first series of Mendel Lectures. They named the series „The Road to the DNA“ and focused the lectures on the historical context of genetics. The two first speakers, Sir Walter Bodmer from Oxford and Charles Weissmann from London, gave their talks in the Augustinian Abbey in Old Brno on May 13, 2003. Subsequent series have addressed more topical scientific findings. Since 2003, more than 90 top scientists, including many Nobel Prize winners, have visited Brno to give a Mendel Lecture.

The Mendel Lectures are also connected with the establishment of the Mendel Museum and revitalization of scientific activities in the Augustinian Abbey in Old Brno in 2003 in the event of the 50th anniversary of the discovery of the structure of deoxyribonucleic acid (DNA). The British Council donated a copy of the original photograph of James Watson and Francis Crick and a copy of their model of DNA from 1953 is on loan from Gustav Ammerer to the Mendel Museum.

Initially, the Mendel Lectures were financially supported by the geneticist Gustav Ammerer from Vienna through his charity Vereinigung zur Förderung der Genomforschung, by the Academy of Sciences of the Czech Republic and by the British Council. Realization of the Mendel Lectures have been also supported by the Masaryk University, Authority of the South Moravian Region, the City of Brno, and the IMP Vienna. Between 2012 and 2014 the lectures were funded by the grant of the Czech Ministry of Education and the European Union (project Pluricell). Since 2015, the Mendel Lectures are supported by the International Clinical Research Center of St. Anne's University Hospital Brno and its project ICRC. From 2016 Masaryk University established Seminar Series and contributes with an essential financial funding.

Present 
The Mendel Lectures are now mainly focused on combining cutting-edge interdisciplinary approaches, technologies and methods of biochemistry, biophysics, molecular biology, computational modelling, imaging, microbiology, cell biology, physiology, genetics, toxicology, developmental biology, evolutionary biology and medicine.

The program of the Mendel Lectures is prepared by a scientific committee composed of Aaron Ciechanover, Simon Boulton, Kim Nasmyth, Lumír Krejčí and Vít Bryja. The Mendel Lectures are now organized by Lumír Krejčí and Dominika Hobzová from the Masaryk University, Lucie Vychodilová from the Mendel Museum, and St. Anne's University Hospital Brno.

List of speakers

References

External links 
 Official website of the Mendel Lectures
 History of the Mendel Lectures
 Official website of the Mendel Museum

Annual events in the Czech Republic
Brno
Genetics education
Gregor Mendel
Masaryk University
Science lecture series
Spring (season) events in the Czech Republic